Spoonley is a surname. Notable people with the surname include:
Jacob Spoonley (born 1987), New Zealand association football goalkeeper
Paul Spoonley (born 1954), New Zealand sociologist